The following is a list of films produced in the Tamil film industry in India in 1979, in alphabetical order.

Post-amendment to the Tamil Nadu Entertainments Tax Act 1939 on 1 April 1958, gross jumped to 140 per cent of net. Commercial Taxes Department disclosed 19.82 crore in entertainment tax revenue for the year.

1979

References

Films, Tamil
Lists of 1979 films by country or language
1979
1970s Tamil-language films